On Camera is an Australian television which aired 1959–1960 on Sydney station ATN-7. A variety series with music and comedy, regulars included Colin Croft and John Ewart. It was shown twice-monthly. Confusingly, the Canadian series On Camera had previously been shown on Australian television.

It is not known if any of the episodes still exist as kinescope recordings or early video-tape.

References

External links
 On Camera at IMDb

1959 Australian television series debuts
1960 Australian television series endings
Black-and-white Australian television shows
English-language television shows
Australian variety television shows
Seven Network original programming